Cornell 5/8/77 is a live album by the American rock band the Grateful Dead. It was recorded on May 8, 1977, at Barton Hall, Cornell University, in Ithaca, New York.  It was released as a three-disc CD and as a five-disc LP on May 5, 2017.

The same recording was also released on May 5, 2017 as part of the four-concert, eleven-CD box set May 1977: Get Shown the Light.

The May 8, 1977 show is a fan favorite, and is widely considered to be one of the band's best performances. Tickets to attend the general admission concert cost $7.50. The soundboard recording was made by longtime Grateful Dead audio engineer Betty Cantor-Jackson. In 2012, the recording was selected for inclusion in the National Recording Registry of the Library of Congress.

Critical reception

Stephen Thomas Erlewine on AllMusic wrote, "Sourced from the original soundboard recordings by Betty Cantor-Jackson, the sound is colorful and vivid, an excellent complement to a prime Dead performance. What makes this such an exceptional performance isn't that it's the Grateful Dead at their most experimental... but at their warmest.... If this isn't the best Grateful Dead show ever – a hard thing to quantify – it's nevertheless at the sweet spot of providing hardcore Deadheads with plenty to savor while offering a good introduction for neophytes, which is more than enough to make it essential. "

Track listing
Disc 1
First set:
"New Minglewood Blues" (traditional, arranged by Grateful Dead) – 5:34
"Loser" (Jerry Garcia, Robert Hunter) – 7:58
"El Paso" (Marty Robbins) – 4:51
"They Love Each Other" (Garcia, Hunter) – 7:29
"Jack Straw" (Bob Weir, Hunter) – 6:29
"Deal" (Garcia, Hunter) – 6:10
"Lazy Lightning" > (Weir, John Perry Barlow) – 3:26
"Supplication" (Weir, Barlow) – 4:48
"Brown-Eyed Women" (Garcia, Hunter) – 5:49
"Mama Tried" (Merle Haggard) – 3:12
"Row Jimmy" (Garcia, Hunter) – 11:14

Disc 2
"Dancing in the Street" (William Stevenson, Marvin Gaye, Ivy Jo Hunter) – 16:32
Second set:
"Scarlet Begonias" > (Garcia, Hunter) – 11:15
"Fire on the Mountain" (Mickey Hart, Hunter) – 15:40
"Estimated Prophet" (Weir, Barlow) – 8:49
Disc 3
"St. Stephen" > (Garcia, Phil Lesh, Hunter) – 5:03
"Not Fade Away" > (Norman Petty, Charles Hardin) – 16:20
"St. Stephen" > (Garcia, Lesh, Hunter) – 1:54
"Morning Dew" (Bonnie Dobson, Tim Rose) – 14:17
Encore:
"One More Saturday Night" (Weir) – 5:10

Personnel
Grateful Dead
Jerry Garcia – guitar, vocals
Donna Jean Godchaux – vocals
Keith Godchaux – keyboards
Mickey Hart – drums
Bill Kreutzmann – drums
Phil Lesh – bass
Bob Weir – guitar, vocals
Production
Produced by Grateful Dead
Produced for release by David Lemieux
Recording: Betty Cantor-Jackson
Mastering: Jeffrey Norman
Tape restoration and speed correction: Jamie Howarth, John Chester
Packaging manager: Shannon Ward
Poster art: Jay Mabrey
Art direction, design: Masaki Koike
Photos: John Reis, Doran Tyson, Michael Wesley Johnson, Lawrence Reichman
Liner notes essay "Myth, Memory, Mystery, and the History of Cornell '77": Nicholas G. Meriwether
Executive producer: Mark Pinkus
Associate producers: Doran Tyson, Ivette Ramos
Tapes provided through the assistance of: ABCD Enterprises, LLC
Tape research: Michael Wesley Johnson
Archival research: UC Santa Cruz Grateful Dead Archive

Charts

References

Grateful Dead live albums
Rhino Records live albums
United States National Recording Registry recordings
2017 live albums
United States National Recording Registry albums